Jamás is the ninth studio album by the Argentine singer Pablo Ruiz. It was released in 2001.

Track list 

 Háblame De Amor
 Obsession
 Jamás
 Tell Me
 No Me Tortures
 A Cambio De Tu Amor
 I Take It Back
 Yo Dudo Que Con Él
 Give Me A Chance
 El Amor Que No Te Di
 Mentiras
 Yo No Quiero Ser El Último
 No me Tortures (Salsa version) (Bonus track)
 Yo Dudo Qué Con Él (Banda version) (Bonus track)
 Jamás (Banda version) (Bonus track)

References 

Pablo Ruiz (singer) albums
2001 albums